Sylvia Flückiger-Bäni (born 1 June 1952) is a Swiss politician, a member of the Swiss People's Party.

Biography 
Flückiger-Bäni has been a representative for Aargau at the National Council of Switzerland since 2007.

In 2009, she took part in the organising committee for the popular initiative for a ban on minaret construction.

She's a member of a Campaign for an Independent and Neutral Switzerland.

References

External links 
 Personal website of Sylvia Flückiger-Bäni
 Flückiger Holz AG, Schöftland entrepreuneurial website

Members of the National Council (Switzerland)
Swiss People's Party politicians
1952 births
Living people
Aargau politicians
Campaign for an Independent and Neutral Switzerland
Women members of the National Council (Switzerland)
21st-century Swiss women politicians
21st-century Swiss politicians